The Ven Edward Chance Henderson (15 October 1916 – 24 September 1997) was Archdeacon of Pontefract from 1968 to 1981.

Townley was born in Newcastle upon Tyne and  educated at Heaton Grammar School and the University of London. He was ordained Deacon in 1939,  and Priest in  1940. After a curacy in Newcastle upon Tyne he was Organising Secretary of the Church Pastoral Aid Society from 1942 to 1945. He held incumbencies in Leeds, Halifax, Dewsbury and Darrington.

References

1916 births
21st-century English Anglican priests
20th-century English Anglican priests
People educated at Heaton Grammar School
Alumni of the University of London
Archdeacons of Pontefract
1997 deaths
People from Newcastle upon Tyne